Linus Karlsson may refer to:
 Linus Karlsson (table tennis)
 Linus Karlsson (ice hockey)